The 1970 London-Mexico World Cup Rally was the first of two World Cup Rallies to be held and the second of four marathon rallies to be held in a nine-year period beginning with the 1968 London-Sydney Marathon. The motor rally started at Wembley Stadium in London on 19 April 1970 and finished in Mexico City on 27 May 1970, covering approximately  through Europe and South America. It was won by Hannu Mikkola and Gunnar Palm, driving a Ford Escort.

Organisation
The event was the brainchild of Wylton Dickson, possibly inspired by the earlier 1968 London-Sydney Marathon, and was to mark the fact that the 1966 FIFA World Cup had been held in London and that the upcoming 1970 FIFA World Cup was to be held in Mexico.  Dickson approached the renowned British rally driver Paddy Hopkirk and together they went to The Daily Mirror for sponsorship.

The event was organised by members of the RAC and the MSA.

Route and scoring
The course covered approximately  through Europe, South America and Central America. Two boats were needed to convey the rally, one to cross the Atlantic Ocean from Lisbon to Rio de Janeiro and a second from Buenaventura, Colombia across the Gulf of Panama to Panama to avoid the impassable Darién Gap. Some of the principal towns and cities visited were, in order:

 European leg (April 19-25)

 London, England
 Dover, England
 Boulogne-sur-Mer, France
 Mannheim, Germany
 Munich, Germany
 Vienna, Austria
 Budapest, Hungary
 Belgrade, Yugoslavia
 Sofia, Bulgaria
 Trieste, Italy
 Venice, Italy
 Genoa, Italy
 Toulouse, France
 Pau, France
 Burgos, Spain
 Salamanca, Spain
 Lisbon, Portugal

 Americas leg (May 9-27)

 Rio de Janeiro, Brazil
 Montevideo, Uruguay
 Buenos Aires, Argentina
 Bariloche, Argentina
 Santiago, Chile, Chile
 La Paz, Bolivia
 Lima, Peru
 Cali, Colombia
 Panama City, Panama
 San José, Costa Rica
 Mexico City, Mexico

Time penalties were given for exceeding set times on the special stages, as well as for other infractions of the rules, and the cars' positions determined by the penalties awarded rather than lowest cumulative times.

Cars

Over one hundred cars started the event.  The rules about what cars could be entered were not restrictive but due to the demanding nature of the course most competitors were conservative and used modified versions of standard models.  That did not prevent there being a wide variety of cars, from Volkswagen Beetles to Rolls-Royces.  There were works (officially sanctioned and prepared) entries from Ford, British Leyland and Moskvitch, and semi-works entries from Citroën.

The Ford team ran modified Escort Mk Is, fitted with an 1850 cc version of the crossflow Kent engine and uprated with various other parts from other Ford models.  Each Ford car had two drivers.  The British Leyland team entered two teams.  The first team ran three Triumph 2.5PI Mark 2s, which were more powerful than the Fords but were significantly heavier; two cars carried a three-man crew, Brian Culcheth preferring to stick with a conventional two-man crew.  The second Leyland team ran Austin Maxis, Austin 1800s (some badged Morris) and a lone Mini Clubman.  Citroën used the venerable DS21. Moskvich used the Moskvich 412 with 1500 cc engine.

Other cars run in the event included:

 BMW 2002ti
 Datsun 1600SSS
 Ford Cortina Lotus
 Ford Escort Mk I
 Hillman Hunter
 Jeep Wagoneer
 Mercedes-Benz 280SE
 Peugeot 404
 Porsche 911
 Rolls-Royce Silver Cloud
 Rolls-Royce Silver Shadow
 Trident Venturer
 VW-based beach buggy

Competitors
Many rally drivers of the day entered the event, including:

 Rauno Aaltonen
 Roger Clark
 Andrew Cowan (winner of the 1968 London-Sydney marathon)
 Brian Culcheth
 Tony Fall
 Paddy Hopkirk
 Timo Mäkinen
 Hannu Mikkola
 Jack Murray
 Gilbert Staepelaere
 Rene Trautmann
 Guy Verrier
 Gastón Perkins
 Jose Migliore
 Alcides Rodriguez (Peugeot #33)
 Henri "Ido" Marang, who was killed in the crash of his Citroën on May 25, two days before the race's end.  His co-driver, Paul Coltelloni survived but was seriously injured.

As well as professional rally drivers, the event attracted a number of well known people, including the footballer Jimmy Greaves, who finished a very creditable sixth, and HRH Prince Michael of Kent, who failed to finish.

Results

References

External links
 London-Mexico: The Complete Story, transcription of an article in the French magazine L'Auto Journal (in French)
 WCR40: The 40th Anniversary Event, The site for the reunion of all surviving cars, crews, mechanics, organisers and associated personnel to be held in April 2010. Now a part of the Heritage Marathon Rally Group website.
 Lotus Cortina to Mexico, The story of the Cal Withers entered Lotus Cortina in the 1970 event

Rally racing series
London to Mexico World Cup Rally